Bakhyt Abdirakhmanuly Sarsekbayev (born 29 November 1981) is a Kazakhastani amateur boxer who won gold at the 2008 Summer Olympics at Welterweight, and won gold medal at the 2006 Asian Games at Welterweight, and won bronze at the 2002 Asian Games at Light Welterweight.

Career
The southpaw holds two wins over Cuban fellow southpaw and 2005 world champion Erislandy Lara. He won bronze at the 2002 Asian Games.

He won gold at the 2006 World University Championships, and won gold at the 2006 Asian Games defeating Chinese Kanat Islam.

At the 2007 World Championships, he beat Xavier Noël and PanAm champ Pedro Lima but was upset by Kanat Islam. 

At the 2008 Summer Olympics, he defeated Cuban Carlos Banteaux Suarez in the finals to win a gold medal.

Olympic Games results 
2008 (as a welterweight)
Defeated Adam Trupish (Canada) 20–1
Defeated Vitaly Gruşac (Moldova) RSC 2 (1:18)
Defeated Dilshod Mahmudov (Uzbekistan) 12–7
Defeated Kim Jung-Joo (South Korea) 10–6
Defeated Carlos Banteaux(Cuba) 18-9

World Amateur Championship results 
2007 (as a welterweight)
Defeated Xavier Noel (France) 18–7
Defeated Velidor Vidic (Bosnia) 26–4
Defeated Pedro Lima (Brazil) 23–11
Lost to Kanat Islam (China) 14–20

External links
 

1981 births
Living people
Kazakhstani male boxers
Welterweight boxers
Olympic boxers of Kazakhstan
Olympic medalists in boxing
Olympic gold medalists for Kazakhstan
Boxers at the 2008 Summer Olympics
Medalists at the 2008 Summer Olympics
Asian Games medalists in boxing
Asian Games gold medalists for Kazakhstan
Asian Games bronze medalists for Uzbekistan
Boxers at the 2002 Asian Games
Boxers at the 2006 Asian Games
Medalists at the 2002 Asian Games
Medalists at the 2006 Asian Games
People from Pavlodar
21st-century Kazakhstani people